There are two Bear constellations:

 Ursa Major (Great Bear), contains the Big Dipper
 Ursa Minor (Small Bear), contains the Little Dipper